William Waryn was the member of the Parliament of England for Salisbury for multiple parliaments from January 1404 to 1419. He was also mayor of Salisbury.

References 

Members of Parliament for Salisbury
English MPs January 1404
Year of birth unknown
Reeves (England)
Year of death unknown
Mayors of Salisbury
English MPs February 1413
English MPs May 1413
English MPs 1417
English MPs 1419